The 43rd Writers Guild of America Awards honored the best television, and film writers of 1990. Winners were announced in 1991.

Winners & Nominees

Film 
Winners are listed first highlighted in boldface.

Television

Documentary

Special Awards

References

External links 
 WGA.org

1990
W
1990 in American cinema
1990 in American television